Violet Neilson (born 16 July 1931) is a Jamaican former politician and teacher. A member of the People's National Party, she was the first female speaker in the House of Representatives and the first female president of the Jamaica Agricultural Society (JAS).

Early life
Neilson was born on 16 July 1931 in Somerton, St. James, Jamaica to Caswell and Ellen (née Stewart). She was educated at the Mico Teachers' College in Kingston and returned to Somerton to become a teacher.

Career
Neilson was a teacher for some nineteen years. She then worked as a secretary for South East St. James member of parliament Upton Robotham. She was Member of Parliament for Saint James East Central from 1989 to 1997.

After retiring from politics, she became an active volunteer at the Somerton United Church.

See also
 List of speakers of the House of Representatives of Jamaica
 Women in the House of Representatives of Jamaica

References

Living people
20th-century Jamaican women politicians
20th-century Jamaican politicians
Speakers of the House of Representatives of Jamaica
People's National Party (Jamaica) politicians
1931 births